River Mayanja is a river in Uganda, East Africa.

Location
The Mayanja River is located in Central Uganda. It starts from the hills, northeast of the town of Wakiso, in Wakiso District, Central Uganda and flows in a northwestern direction to empty into River Kafu, Nakaseke District at its border with Masindi District and Kyankwanzi District.

The source of River Mayanja is located in Wakiso, with coordinates: Latitude:0.41000, 32.52000. River Mayanja enters River Kafu near the village of Ndede, in Nakaseke District, with coordinates: Latitude:1.3575; Longitude:31.8200.

Course
On its course northwestwards, the river traverses or forms the borders of the following districts : Wakiso District, Mpigi District, Kiboga District, Kyankwanzi District and Nakaseke District.

External links
Rivers and Lakes of Uganda
Location of Mayanja River At Google Maps

See also
River Kafu
Wakiso
Wakiso District
Mpigi District
Kiboga District
Kyankwanzi District
Nakaseke District

References

Rivers of Uganda
Wakiso District
Mpigi District
Kiboga District
Kyankwanzi District
Nakaseke District